Merrill House may refer to:
(sorted by state, then city/town)

Merrill House (Rogers, Arkansas), listed on the National Register of Historic Places (NRHP) in Benton County
Charles W. Merrill House, Orinda, California, listed on the NRHP in Contra Costa County
Samuel Merrill House, Pasadena, California, listed on the NRHP in Los Angeles County
Merrill-Poor House, Andover, Maine, listed on the NRHP in Cumberland County
Capt. Reuel and Lucy Merrill House, Cumberland Center Station, Maine, listed on the NRHP in Cumberland County
Merrill Hall, Farmington, Maine, listed on the NRHP in Franklin County
Merrill House Museum, Jacksonville, Florida
Capt. Reuben Merrill House, Yarmouth, Maine, listed on the NRHP in Cumberland County
Merrill Estate, Barnstable, Massachusetts, listed on the NRHP in Contra Barnstable County
Merrill Double House, Worcester, Massachusetts, listed on the NRHP in Worcester County
Harry Merrill House, Hutchinson, Minnesota, listed on the NRHP in McLeod County
Merrill-Newhardt House, Iuka, Mississippi, listed on the NRHP in Tishomingo County
Merrill-Maley House, Jackson, Mississippi, listed on the NRHP in Hinds County
Baker-Merrill House, Easton, New York, listed on the NRHP in Washington County
Louis Edgar and Clara H. Merrill House, Richmond, Utah, listed on the NRHP in Cache County
R. D. Merrill House, Seattle, Washington, listed on the NRHP in King County
Levi Merrill House, Eau Claire, Wisconsin, listed on the NRHP in Eau Claire County
Lovejoy and Merrill-Nowlan Houses, Janesville, Wisconsin, listed on the NRHP in Rock County

See also
Henry Merrell House